Créquy is a commune in the Pas-de-Calais department in the Hauts-de-France region of France.

Geography
One of many small villages in Artois, Créquy gives it name to the small stream, the Créquoise, that rises in the nearby hills and is one of the waterways of the 'Seven Valleys' tourist area.

Population

Coat of arms
The Créquy coat of arms is derived from 'ardentis quercus robur mythicon' ('the flaming oak of myth').

The aforementioned oak was a particularly fine example of the genus, with particularly impressive girth, which was a popular gathering point for visitors around the summer solstice (ambiguous; dates of recorded assemblages are sporadic & the solstictic link may be happenchance).
The tree was said to have spontaneously combusted during one convocation, henceforth the legend was born.

Notable people
The Créquy family lived nearby and took its name from this place.

See also
Communes of the Pas-de-Calais department

References

External links

  Créquy, village de la Morinie 
Official Web site 

Communes of Pas-de-Calais
Artois